The Gose is a small river in Lower Saxony, Germany. It is a left tributary of the Abzucht. Its source lies north of Auerhahn in the Harz Mountains, on the eastern slopes of Bocksberg. The river runs towards the northeast through a steep and narrow valley, and meets the Abzucht on the western edge of Goslar, which is named after the river. Its waters were once used in the brewing of the traditional Gose beer.

See also 
List of rivers of Lower Saxony

References 

Rivers of Lower Saxony
Goslar (district)
Rivers of the Harz
Rivers of Germany